Petronella Veronica Maria "Nel" Zwier (29 August 1936 – 8 October 2001) was a Dutch high jumper. She competed at the 1960 Summer Olympics and finished in ninth place. In 1959 she won the Amateur Athletic Association of England title with a jump of 1.65 m.

References

1936 births
2001 deaths
Athletes (track and field) at the 1960 Summer Olympics
Dutch female high jumpers
Olympic athletes of the Netherlands
People from Enkhuizen
Sportspeople from North Holland